Machala is a 2022 Nigerian music sang and performed by Carter Efe, Vizkidx and Berri Tiga. The song was released on 29 July 2022 as an ode to a popular music icon, Wizkid.  Machala enjoyed wide supports from Wizkid fans around the globe and it reached  significant positions on international streaming apps. It was in  14th position of 50 on the Afrobeats charts US Billboard, made its debut into 1st and 2nd positions in Apple Music Nigeria Top 100 and TurnTable Nigeria Top 100 respectively. 

However, shortly after the success of the song, the two artistes Carter Efe and Beri Tiga began war of words over the ownership of the song.  In August 2022, the song was removed from Apple and Spotify streaming apps.

References 

Nigerian music
Nigerian hip hop
Nigerian afropop songs
2022 songs